The 2003 North Indian Ocean cyclone season was the last season that tropical cyclones were not publicly labeled by India Meteorological Department (IMD). Also was mostly focused in the Bay of Bengal, where six of the seven depressions developed. The remaining system was a tropical cyclone that developed in the Arabian Sea in November, which was also the only system that did not affect land. There were three cyclonic storms, which was below the average of 4–6. Only one storm formed before the start of the monsoon season in June, although it was also the most notable. On May 10, a depression formed in the central Bay of Bengal, and within a few days became a very severe cyclonic storm. After it stalled, it drew moisture from the southwest to produce severe flooding across Sri Lanka, killing 254 people and becoming the worst floods there since 1947. Damage on the island totaled $135 million (2003 USD). The storm eventually made landfall in Myanmar on May 19. It is possible that the storm contributed to a deadly heat wave in India due to shifting air currents.

In late July, a monsoon depression moved across much of India, and another monsoon disturbance persisted off the coast of Pakistan. The interaction between the two systems resulted in heavy rainfall across the region, flooding dozens of villages. Monsoonal rainfall killed 285 people between Pakistan and India in the summer of 2003. In late August, another monsoon depression moved across northeastern India. A depression that struck Andhra Pradesh in India killed 21 people in early October. Later that month, a tropical depression crossed Thailand from the western Pacific Ocean, contributing to ongoing flooding that killed 19. Once in the Indian Ocean, this system struck southeastern India without causing much damage. The last system of the year was a cyclonic storm that struck southeastern India in December, killing 81 people and causing $28 million in damage (2003 USD).


Season summary 

There were seven depressions throughout the season, of which three attained cyclonic storm status. One of the cyclonic storms formed before the start of the monsoon season, two depressions formed during the monsoon season from June to September, and the remaining systems formed after September. The number of depressions was similar or greater than that of the previous three years. However, the total of 3 cyclonic storms was below the average of 5.4.

In May 2004, seven of the eight members of the World Meteorological Organization panel on tropical cyclones for the North Indian Ocean met in Colombo, Sri Lanka to review the season. During the meeting, the panel announced the first list of tropical cyclone names to be used in the basin for the following season. The panel noted the increasing frequency of deadly natural disasters in the region, such as the floods that affected Sri Lanka in May 2003 from a cyclone. One of the panel's goals was increased coordination between the countries in the region. The India Meteorological Department (IMD) in New Delhi served as the official Regional Specialized Meteorological Center, although the Joint Typhoon Warning Center also issued warnings for the region in an unofficial capacity. The IMD utilized satellite data from EUMETSAT to track cyclones, as well as radars from Bangladesh, Sri Lanka, and India.

There were several other monsoon disturbances that affected various countries in the region, including Bangladesh, Pakistan, and Oman. On July 27, during the monsoon season, an area of convection exited from the coast of Pakistan. On the next day, the thunderstorms organized around the center, prompting the Pakistan Meteorological Department to classify the system as a monsoon depression. The IMD operationally classified the system as a depression on July 29, although it was dropped during the agency's annual report. The system weakened into a remnant low on July 30. The system drew moisture from another depression that had moved across India from the Bay of Bengal, bringing three days of heavy rainfall to Karachi, Pakistan. Badin in southeastern Pakistan recorded  of rainfall in 24 hours. The rainfall extended into northwestern India, and in Gujarat, a station received more than its annual rainfall during the deluge. Flooding from the heavy rainfall destroyed widespread crops and flooded dozens of villages, and ongoing rains persisted throughout the summer, killing 285 people in the two countries.

Systems

Very Severe Cyclonic Storm BOB 01 (01B) 

The first storm of the season originated from the monsoon trough, developing into a depression on May 10 in the Bay of Bengal. This made it a very severe cyclonic storm according to the IMD. The storm later drifted northward and later to the east in the central Bay of Bengal, although increased wind shear induced weakening into a deep depression. The system eventually began a steady northeast track, bringing it ashore in western Myanmar on May 19 as a re-intensified cyclonic storm. It dissipated shortly thereafter over land, and was no longer observable on satellite imagery by May 20.

Early and later in its duration, the storm brought rainfall to the Andaman and Nicobar Islands. Although the storm never passed within  of the island, the cyclone produced torrential rainfall across southwest Sri Lanka after it stalled in the central Bay of Bengal. The storm drew moisture from the southwest that coalesced in the mountainous portion of the island. A station at Ratnapura recorded  of rainfall in 18 hours on May 17, including  in one hour. This followed a period of regular rainfall in the first 15 days of May across the region. The rains caused flooding and landslides in southwestern Sri Lanka that destroyed 24,750 homes and damaged 32,426 others, leaving about 800,000 people homeless. Overall damage totaled about $29 million (2003 USD), mostly to roads and buildings, and there were 254 deaths. This made it the worst floods on the island since 1947. The storm also drew moisture away from India, which possibly contributed to a heat wave that killed 1,200 people, and dropped heavy rainfall in Myanmar.

Deep Depression BOB 02 

Late on July 25, the system made landfall north of Balasore in Odisha state. It progressed inland across India, weakening to depression status but remaining a distinct system. On July 28, the depression degenerated into a remnant low over Rajasthan in northwestern India, later merging with a heat low. Rainfall also spread into Bangladesh.

Depression BOB 03 

The system largely consisted of a circulation without much organized convection. It moved to the west-northwest and failed to intensify, moving ashore near Chandabali, Odisha on August 28. Once over land, the depression stalled, before dissipating on August 29. The system was largely connected with the monsoon, resulting in an increase in rainfall over northeastern India.

Depression BOB 04 

A low-pressure area persisted on October 4 in the western Bay of Bengal, off the east coast of Tamil Nadu. Two days later, the system organized into a depression and moved northward. Early on October 7, the depression made landfall at Kalingapatnam, Andhra Pradesh. After moving slowly northwestward over land, the system turned to the northeast, degenerating into a remnant low on October 10 over West Bengal. Kolkata received , and rainfall spread as far northeast as Assam. The rains caused widespread flooding across southeastern India, inundating 20 villages and covering 16,000 hectares (39,000 acres) of rice paddies. A tornado spawned by the depression injured 11 people and damaged several houses in Murshidabad. Across its track, the depression killed 13 people in West Bengal and another eight in Andhra Pradesh.

Deep Depression BOB 05 (23W) 

On October 21, an area of convection formed in the Gulf of Thailand in the western Pacific Ocean. With low wind shear, the thunderstorms organized around the circulation, prompting the JTWC to initiate advisories on Tropical Depression 23W. While drifting northward, the system failed to organize further. Later, a ridge steered the depression to the west, bringing it ashore Thailand on October 24 near Hua Hin District. The next day, the circulation entered the Bay of Bengal after weakening over land, passing near the Andaman and Nicobar Islands. On October 26, the IMD began classifying the system as a depression. The convection gradually reorganized as the system turned to the northwest, prompting the JTWC to upgrade it to a minimal tropical storm on October 27. On the same day, the IMD upgraded it to deep depression status. The system made landfall between Visakhapatnam and Kalingapatnam in Andhra Pradesh on October 28, and dissipated the next day.

While crossing Thailand, the depression produced heavy rainfall reaching  at Hua Hin over a 24‑hour period. Ongoing monsoonal flooding in the country forced thousands of people to evacuate their houses. About 22,000 cattle were killed, and large areas of farmlands were inundated. Officials opened the Kaeng Krajan Dam to prevent it from being destroyed by the floods. Damage from the depression alone was estimated at ฿1 billion baht ($25 million 2003 USD). The monsoonal rains in October and November 2003 in the country killed 19 people. In India, the depression dropped locally heavy rainfall, reaching  in Dummugudem. There was little damage in the country.

Severe Cyclonic Storm ARB 06 (02A) 

The lone system in the Arabian Sea in the season originated from a trough. On November 10, an area of convection formed off the western coast of India. With little wind shear, the system organized further as it moved west-southwestward due to a ridge to the north. On November 12, the system developed into a depression and quickly intensified into a deep depression. That day, the JTWC classified the system as Tropical Cyclone 02A, and it intensified into a cyclonic storm on November 13. Subsequently, drier air weakened the storm, causing the convection to decrease. By November 15, the storm had weakened to depression status while approaching Somalia. On November 16, the depression degenerated into a remnant low, and subsequently dissipated.

Severe Cyclonic Storm BOB 07 (03B) 

A steady decline in the wind shear allowed the thunderstorms to organize, and a depression formed on December 11. On the next day, the JTWC initiated advisories on Tropical Cyclone 03B. The storm moved generally northwestward, steered by a ridge to the north. The IMD upgraded the system to a deep depression and later cyclonic storm on December 13, and further to a severe cyclonic storm a day later. The storm also developed well-defined outflow due to an approaching trough from the west. At around 14:30 UTC on December 15, the storm made landfall near False Divi Point in southeastern India, along the coast of Andhra Pradesh. After turning to the northeast over land, the system rapidly weakened, degenerating into a remnant low on December 16.

Before the storm made landfall, officials evacuated about 20,000 people. As the storm moved ashore in India, it produced heavy rainfall that reached  at Repalle, Andhra Pradesh. Light rains fell in neighboring Tamil Nadu. The rains deluged  of fields in Andhra Pradesh. The storm damaged or destroyed 9,090 houses, and downed several trees and power lines. Local news reports indicated that the storm produced  waves as it moved ashore, which damaged a ship and forced its crew to be rescued by the Indian Coast Guard. In Andhra Pradesh, the storm killed 83 people and resulted in $28 million (2003 USD) in damage. After the storm, the government provided 50,000 rupees (US$1,111) to the family of every storm victim.

Season effects 

|-
| BOB 01 || || bgcolor=#| || bgcolor=#| || bgcolor=#| || Sri Lanka, India, Myanmar,  Bangladesh ||$135 million || 260 ||
|-
| BOB 02 ||  ||bgcolor=#| || bgcolor=#| || bgcolor=#| || East India, Bangladesh || || ||
|-
| BOB 03 ||  || bgcolor=#| || bgcolor=#| || bgcolor=#| || Northeastern India || || ||
|-
| BOB 04 ||  || bgcolor=#| || bgcolor=#| || bgcolor=#| || India ||None || 21||
|-
| BOB 05 ||  || bgcolor=#| || bgcolor=#| || bgcolor=#| || Thailand, Malaysia, Myanmar, India || || ||
|-
| ARB 06 ||  || bgcolor=#| || bgcolor=#| || bgcolor=#| || Maldives, Somalia ||None ||None ||
|-
| BOB 07 ||  || bgcolor=#| || bgcolor=#| || bgcolor=#| ||India, Indonesia, Sri Lanka ||$28 million || 83||
|-

See also 

 2003 Atlantic hurricane season
 2003 Pacific hurricane season
 2003 Pacific typhoon season
 South-West Indian Ocean cyclone seasons: 2002–03, 2003–04
 Australian region cyclone seasons: 2002–03, 2003–04
 South Pacific cyclone seasons: 2002–03, 2003–04

References